Amadeo Labarta Rey (31 March 1905 – 30 July 1989) was a Spanish footballer. He competed in the men's tournament at the 1928 Summer Olympics.

References

External links
 
 

1905 births
1989 deaths
Spanish footballers
Spain international footballers
Olympic footballers of Spain
Footballers at the 1928 Summer Olympics
People from Pasaia
Association football midfielders
Footballers from the Basque Country (autonomous community)
CA Osasuna managers
Spanish football managers
Real Sociedad footballers
La Liga players
Segunda División players
Basque Country international footballers